Jack Foster (30 November 1912 – 31 January 1995) was  a former Australian rules footballer who played with Melbourne in the Victorian Football League (VFL).

Notes

External links 

1912 births
1995 deaths
Australian rules footballers from Victoria (Australia)
Melbourne Football Club players